Thomas "Tommy" Henry Newbould (birth registered fourth ¼ 1880 – 27 October 1964), also known by the nickname of 'Trapper', was an English rugby union, and professional rugby league footballer who played in the 1900s, 1910s, and 1920s.

Background
Thomas 'Trapper'  Newbould's birth was registered in Wakefield district, West Riding of Yorkshire, his death aged 83 was registered in Pontefract district, West Riding of Yorkshire, England, and he is buried at Castleford Cemetery, Healdfield Road, Castleford, West Yorkshire, England.

Playing career

International honours
Tommy 'Trapper' Newbould won caps for England (RL) while at Wakefield Trinity in 1909 against Australia, and Wales, and won caps for Great Britain (RL) while at Wakefield Trinity on the 1910 Great Britain Lions tour of Australia and New Zealand against Australia, and Australasia.

County honours
Tommy 'Trapper' Newbould won caps for Yorkshire (RU) while at Castleford in 1904, and won caps for Yorkshire (RL) while at Wakefield Trinity.

Challenge Cup Final appearances
Tommy 'Trapper' Newbould played , and scored the first try in Wakefield Trinity's 17–0 victory over Hull F.C. in the 1909 Challenge Cup Final during the 1908–09 season at Headingley Rugby Stadium, Leeds on Tuesday 20 April 1909, in front of a crowd of 23,587.

County Cup Final appearances
Tommy 'Trapper' Newbould played  in Wakefield Trinity's 8–2 victory over Huddersfield in the 1910 Yorkshire County Cup Final during the 1910–11 season at Headingley Rugby Stadium, Leeds on Saturday 3 December 1910.

Notable tour matches
Tommy 'Trapper' Newbould played  in Wakefield Trinity's 5–5 draw with the New Zealand in the tour match at Belle Vue, Wakefield on Wednesday 23 October 1907, and played , and scored two tries in the 20–13 victory over Australia in the 1908–09 Kangaroo tour of Great Britain match at Belle Vue, Wakefield on Saturday 19 December 1908.

Club career
Tommy 'Trapper' Newbould made his début for Wakefield Trinity on Saturday 22 November 1902. During 1921, and aged 41, he joined Castleford Rovers who had initially played in the Lock Lane area of Castleford, but moved to play near Cutsyke Station, where they played Keighley in the first match of the 1921–22 season, he joined along with the coach Fawcett, a former / for Leeds, Cole from Keighley, Hirst a / for Harrogate RLFC, and Taylor a forward for Yorkshire and Hull FC, he appears to have scored no drop-goals (or field-goals as they are currently known in Australasia), but prior to the 1974–75 season all goals, whether; conversions, penalties, or drop-goals, scored 2-points, consequently prior to this date drop-goals were often not explicitly documented, therefore '0' drop-goals may indicate drop-goals not recorded, rather than no drop-goals scored. In addition, prior to the 1949–50 season, the archaic field-goal was also still a valid means of scoring points.

Contemporaneous Article Extract
"Joined Trinity from Castleford R.U.F.C., and his partnership with Harry Slater provided Trinity with one of the best half-back combinations in the league. Like fellow tourist H. Kershaw, he played a prominent part in the 1909 N.U. Cup success and played regularly for Yorkshire County. Newbould played in the 1910 Sydney Test."

References

External links

1880 births
1964 deaths
Castleford R.U.F.C. players
England national rugby league team players
English rugby league players
English rugby union players
Great Britain national rugby league team players
Rugby league five-eighths
Rugby league halfbacks
Rugby league players from Wakefield
Rugby union players from Wakefield
Wakefield Trinity captains
Wakefield Trinity players
Yorkshire County RFU players
Yorkshire rugby league team players
York Wasps players